Paul Bartsch (14 August 1871 Tuntschendorf, Silesia – 24 April 1960 McLean, Virginia) was an American malacologist and carcinologist. He was named the last of those belonging to the "Descriptive Age of Malacology".

Early life
Bartsch emigrated with his parents to the U.S.A in 1880, first to Missouri and then to Burlington, Iowa. As a child, he took up jobs in his spare time in several employments. He soon took an interest in nature, first by keeping a small menagerie at home, and during his high school years, collecting birds and preparing skins. He established a natural-history club in his home with a little museum and a workshop. By the time he went to the University of Iowa in 1893, he had collected 2,000 skins.

Among his professors at the university were the University of Iowa were the geologist Samuel Calvin, botanists Thomas H. Macbride and Bohumil Shimek, and the zoologist Charles C. Nutting. He graduated from the university with a B.S. in 1896, and M.S. in 1899, and PhD in 1905.

In 1896 he was invited by William H. Dall to the Smithsonian Institution in Washington to serve as his assistant in the Division of Mollusks. At that time, Bartsch knew little about mollusks and expected more to make ornithology his life work.

In 1899 he became an instructor in zoology at the Columbian University (later George Washington University), but declined the next year a full-time professorship as he was more devoted to scientific research. Nevertheless, he was later given the title of professor, as he continued to teach in the evening and in the weekends. He was joined a few years later by W.H. Dall  in directing  graduate students. Bartsch continued teaching zoology until he retired in 1945 with the rank of professor emeritus.

In 1901 Bartsch became lecturer on histology at the Medical School of Howard University. His workload became heavier as the next year he was promoted to professor on Histology and became director of the histology laboratory. The next year he became Director of the Physiology Laboratory and Lecturer in Medical Zoology. he continued in this capacity for 37 years.

In October 1932 Eldridge R. Johnson equipped and offered for use his yacht Caroline to the Smithsonian Institution in what was to be known as the Johnson-Smithsonian Deep-Sea Expedition to the Puerto Rico Trench. The Smithsonian chose Bartsch to direct the expedition. Caroline sailed from New York on 21 January 1933 and returned to the Washington Navy Yard on 14 March 1933. The expedition included investigators from several disciplines and government agencies and institutions interested in oceanographic work. Those included the Naval Research Laboratory, Agriculture and Commerce Departments as well as The American Museum of Natural History, Carnegie Institution and the Oceanographic Institution of Woods Hole. In addition to the scientific party Johnson and his son, E. R. Fenimore Johnson who had helped prepare the yacht, and invited guest went with the expedition. Aside from description and addition of new species to collections three lines of echo soundings were gathered across the trench with the Navy echo sounding device operated by Thomas Townsend Brown and water samples at various depths.

In 1956 he retired from the Smithsonian Institution  after more than fifty years of service. He retreated into his estate on the Potomac shore at Mason's Neck, below Fort Belvoir, Virginia. He spent his time in turning this estate into a wildlife sanctuary.

In 1902, he started systematic scientific bird banding, the first to do so in modern times.

In 1914 he became curator at the National Museum of Natural History of the combined divisions of Mollusks and Marine Invertebrates.  He continued in this function until 1945. As his workload became too heavy, the two divisions were separated again in 1920.

Paul Bartsch invented, in 1922, an underwater camera.

His papers are held at George Washington University.

Contributions to the Mollusca
At first his works as an assistant of W.H. Dall consisted in cataloguing, together with Charles T. Simpson, the exhibit collection of the Smithsonian Institution. He published his first malacological paper, as a junior author together with Dr. Dall, in September 1901: A New Californian Bittium. Nautilus, 15 (5): 58-59. His first malacological publication as sole author was in May 1902: A New Rissoina from California. Nautilus, 16 (1). In 1903 he started the study of the Pyramidellidae, a family of mostly small and minute ectoparasitic sea snails. In 1905 he was awarded the degree of Doctor of Philosophy at the University of Iowa, with a dissertation based on the Pyramidellidae of the West Coast of America. Also in 1905 he became assistant curator at the Smithsonian Institution.

Between 1903 and 1907 he published twelve papers on land and freshwater shells, showing his interest in Philippine land snails and in the family Urocoptidae in America.

On 9 October 1907, Bartsch left on expedition with the steamer Albatross in San Francisco to take part in a cruise in Philippine waters and the China Seas collecting specimens of marine and non-marine snails. Over 87,000 specimens were cataloged, many of which still have to be studied. Bartsch left after ten months this expedition in Hong Kong and traveled home via Europe, arriving in Washington in October 1908. In 1909 he published, with W.H. Dall as co-author, his monograph on the West American Pyramidellidae. This was followed by twelve papers on the same subject between 1910 and 1912.

In 1915 he published, after five years of preparation, his study of South African marine mollusks, initiated by the donation  by William H. Turton of his collection in 1906.

In February and April 1909 he was a member of another voyage of the Albatross along the Pacific coast from San Diego to Baja California. This resulted again in a collection of mollusks and other invertebrates.

In May 1912 he was invited on an expedition with the vessel Anton Dohrn to the Bahamas. He became intrigued by the variety of the halophilic land snail Cerion. His study and later experiments resulted in 1920 in the publication of the paper  Experiments in the Breeding of Cerions, Papers from the Department of Marine Biology, Carnegie Institution of Washington, 14 (282)

Another expedition occurred in May and June 1914 with the schooner Thomas Barrera in the Cuban waters. This made a lasting impression on Bartsch and led to his later expeditions to the Greater and Lesser Antilles, resulting in several publications on West Indian land snails.

In 1916, at the request of the U.S. Navy he started a study of shipworms. He suggested several novel procedures against these boring clams in his paper Report on the Marine Boring Mollusks in Guantanamo Bay, Cuba. Public Works of the Navy under the Cognizance of the Bureau of Yards and Docks and the Corps of Civil Engineers, U.S. Navy. Navy Department Bureau of Yards and Docks Bulletin, 28:48-50. This was followed in the coming years by many other studies on the same subject.

In the following years he continued his travels to the Florida Keys, the Bahamas, Cuba and the West Indies. During these expeditions more than a half million mollusks were collected, as well as many marine invertebrates, fish, birds and reptiles.

In 1927 he started his study on the large gastropod family Turridae. Between 1934 and 1950 he wrote eight papers on various genera in this family.

Between 1923 and 1939 he published several papers on intermediate snail hosts of the Asiatic blood fluke Schistosoma japonicum.

Between 1937 and 1941 he studied, jointly with the Cuban malacologist Don Carlos de la Torre, the Cuban land snail fauna. This resulted in a number of papers on the families Annulariidae, Helicinidae, and Urocoptidae.

Bibliography
 Dall W. H. & Bartsch P. (1909). A Monograph of West American Pyramidellid Mollusks. 
 (1920)  Experiments in the breeding of cerions. Carnegie Institution of Washington. 
 Henderson J. B. Jr. & Bartsch P. (1920). "A classification of the American operculate land mollusks of the family Annulariidae". Proceedings of the United States National Museum 58: 49-82.
 with John Treadwell Nichols. (1945). Fishes and shells of the Pacific world. The Macmillan Company.

Species named by Bartsch
Of these 1257 were published together with another author. These taxa, except three, were all mollusks.

See also :Category:Taxa named by Paul Bartsch

Taxa named in honor of Paul Bartsch
The species Bartsch's squid (Uroteuthis bartschi ) was named in his honor by Harald A. Rehder.

The World Register of Marine Species lists 61 taxa with the epithet, bartschi, many of which have become synonyms.

A species and a subspecies of Caribbean lizards were named in his honor: Anolis bartschi and Cyclura carinata bartschi.

References

External links
 Guide to the Paul Bartsch Papers, 1894-1945, Special Collections Research Center, Estelle and Melvin Gelman Library, The George Washington University
 
 BEMON
 http://www.pwrc.usgs.gov/resshow/perry/bios/BartschPaul.htm

Smithsonian Institution Archives
 Paul Bartsch Field Book, 1907-1908
 Paul Bartsch Papers, undated
 Paul Bartsch Papers, 1901-1963
 Paul Bartsch Papers, 1910-1912
 Paul Bartsch Papers, 1920s-1934
 Paul Bartsch Papers, Collected Glass Plate Negatives, 1897-1938
 Paul Bartsch Papers, Glass Plate Negatives, Photographs, and Negatives, undated

1871 births
1960 deaths
People from Radków
People from the Province of Silesia
German emigrants to the United States
American malacologists
American carcinologists
Conchologists
University of Iowa alumni
George Washington University faculty
Smithsonian Institution people